Mignano Monte Lungo is a comune (municipality) in the Province of Caserta in the Italian region Campania, located about  northwest of Naples and about  northwest of Caserta.

Mignano Monte Lungo borders the following municipalities: Conca della Campania, Galluccio, Presenzano, Rocca d'Evandro, San Pietro Infine, San Vittore del Lazio, Sesto Campano, Venafro.

History
The first settlers in the area were the Sidicini; the Etruscans founded here the town of Cesennia, which later passed under Roman control. After the fall of the Western Roman Empire, Mignano became part of the Lombard Duchy of Benevento and, in 776, part of the County of Capua. In 1139 the nearby Galluccio was the seat of a successful ambush of Roger II of Sicily's troops against the army of Pope Innocent II, who, captured, was forced to sign a treaty of peace in the Mignano castle.

After the Hohenstaufen and Angevine domination, the Aragonese gave it as a fief to Ettore Fieramosca. In 1581 his heir Ettore Leognano Fieramosca ceded it to Giulio Cesare De Capua. In 1734 the troops of Charles of Bourbon besieged here Marshal von Traun, who had to flee to Capua.

During World War II Mignano was the seat of fierce fightings, part of the Battle of San Pietro Infine. In order to facilitate their escapement, the German destroyed the fortress and the bridge on the Rava. The nearby Monte Lungo was conquered on December 16, 1943, by the Italian 1° Raggruppamento Motorizzato.

Main sights
The castle, of ancient origins, several times renewed. The current structure dates mostly to the interventions of Guido Fieramosca.
Church of Santa Maria la Grande (16th century)
Medieval Porta Fratte gate, now the only remainder of the old medieval walls.

People
Michelina Di Cesare, 19th century bandit
Francesco Fuoco, economist

See also
Treaty of Mignano
Battle of Cassino
Battle of San Germano

References

Cities and towns in Campania